Grand-Morié is a town in south-eastern Ivory Coast. It is a sub-prefecture of Agboville Department in Agnéby-Tiassa Region, Lagunes District.

Grand-Morié was a commune until March 2012, when it became one of 1126 communes nationwide that were abolished.

In 2014, the population of the sub-prefecture of Grand-Morié was 17,907.

Villages
The 8 villages of the sub-prefecture of Grand-Morié and their population in 2014 are:

References

Sub-prefectures of Agnéby-Tiassa
Former communes of Ivory Coast